The 2015 Birmingham Bulls season was the team's 32nd season in competitive British American Football. It was also the first season under rookie Head Coach Mark Pagett and Chairman Richard Penwright, whilst Rob Amor returned for a fifth year as Club Secretary. 
The Bulls entered the 2015 season in the second tier following a league restructure, and were considered by some to be favourites for post-season success and immediate promotion back to the top tier.

Following the departure of the previous coaching staff, former player Matt Sheldon was appointed as Offensive Coordinator, while Alan Steel, departing the Coventry Jets, was appointed as Defensive Coordinator. Coaches Mark Webb and Paul Roberts were retained in their role as Special Teams and Defensive Back coaches respectively.

Part way through the season, Offensive Coordinator Matt Sheldon stepped down from his role and was replaced by O-Line coach Gary Hodgen. Despite early season promise, including an away win against the eventual league champions Farnham Knights, a five-game losing streak put paid to any notion of post-season football in 2015.

Recruitment
Following successful recruitment sessions in the winter of 2014, several rookies joined the team, along with former players returning from playing in Europe.

Rookies

Transfers

Staff

Playing staff

Final roster

Statistics
Offence

Defence

Special teams

Bulls players set or equalled several team records throughout the 2015 season. Mark Bonazebi recorded 1206 rushing yards, the most in Bulls history, and his 93-yard run against the Hertfordshire Cheetahs was the longest in team history. Gareth Thomas' 9 total takeaways was a new Bulls season record, and his 4 interceptions against the Hertfordshire Cheetahs was a record for most single game takeaways and interceptions. His 8 total interceptions equalled Hall of Famer Paul Roberts' single season record. His 125 punt return yards against the East Kent Mavericks was also a single-game record for the Bulls.

Award Winners
The Bulls held their annual awards night on 20 September 2015.

Schedule

Preseason

Regular season

Note: Intra-division opponents are in bold text.

Game Notes
Week 1: vs Ouse Valley Eagles
The Bulls lost a narrow opener to the visiting Ouse Valley Eagles by one score following a controversial touchdown at the end of the second quarter. The Eagles capitalised on Bulls turnovers in the fourth quarter to pull away and secure an opening day victory.

Passers
 Dan Wilkes: 0/4, 0 yards, 0 TD, 1 INT
 Stuart Williams: 0/13, 0 yards, 0 TD, 2 INT

Rushers
 Rob Brown: 14 carries, 85 yards, 0 TDs
 Marc Bonazebi: 3 carries, 36 yards, 1 TD

Defenders
 Jake Harbon: 10 total tackles, 7 solo, 1 INT, 1 FF, 1 FR, 1 TD
 Jack Pemberton: 5 total tackles, 4 solo, 2 INTs, 1 break up
 Stephen Stoakes: 6 total tackles, 3 solo, 1 FF
 Dominic Taylor: 7 total tackles, 6 solo

Week 2: at Cambridgeshire Cats
The Bulls travelled to Cambridge and won comfortably thanks to a strong ground attack from Rob Brown and Mark Bonazebi and pass rush from the defensive line.

Passers
 Dan Wilkes: 3/12, 27 yards, 0 TD, 0 INT

Rushers
 Rob Brown: 20 carries, 157 yards, 3 TDs
 Marc Bonazebi: 21 carries, 114 yards, 2 TDs

Receivers
 Kieron Hinds: 1 rec, 14 yards, 0 TD

Defenders
 Scott Robinson: 4 total tackles, 3 solo, 3 sacks, 1 FR
 Lee Macken: 3 total tackles, 3 solo, 1 FF
 Jake Harbon: 10 total tackles, 5 solo, 0.5 sacks
 Tom Durn: 1 total tackle, 1 solo, 1.5 sacks

Week 3: vs Hertfordshire Cheetahs
Back at home, the Bulls secondary stepped up in a big way, picking the ball off seven times, including four interceptions by cornerback Gareth Thomas, while Bonazebi again carried the offence to move the Bulls to 3-1.

Passers
 Dan Wilkes: 3/15, 56 yards, 0 TD, 1 INT

Rushers
 Marc Bonazebi: 27 carries, 155 yards, 1 TD

Receivers
 Michael Beaty: 2 rec, 52 yards, 0 TD

Defenders
 Gareth Thomas: 0 tackles, 4 INT, 2 break ups
 Dominic Taylor: 3 total tackles, 1 solo, 1 INT, 1 TD
 Olu Amudipe: 7 total tackles, 3 solo, 1.5 sacks
 Jack Pemberton: 4 total tackles, 2 solo, 1 INT

Week 4: at Farnham Knights
The Bulls travelled to the favoured Knights but a 300+ yard display by running back Bonazebi paired with a last second pick by Thomas meant the Bulls came away with a signature win.

Passers
 Dan Wilkes: 1/12, 16 yards, 0 TD, 4 INT

Rushers
 Marc Bonazebi: 32 carries, 310 yards, 4 TD

Receivers
 Michael Beaty: 1 rec, 16 yards, 0 TD

Defenders
 Gareth Thomas: 6 total tackles, 6 solo, 1 INT, 1 break up
 Jake Harbon: 7 total tackles, 3 solo, 1 INT, 1 break up
 Jack Pemberton: 4 total tackles, 3 solo, 1 INT, 1 break up
 Dotun Ademiju: 4 total tackles, 2 solo, 1 sack

Week 5: vs Colchester Gladiators
The Bulls came back down to earth with a bump, and despite signs of an improving passing game, a number of turnovers brought an end to the Bulls' winning streak.

Passers
 Dan Wilkes: 2/15, 82 yards, 1 TD, 3 INT

Rushers
 Marc Bonazebi: 33 carries, 97 yards, 0 TD

Receivers
 Marc Bonazebi: 1 rec, 47 yards, 1 TD
 Michael Beaty: 1 rec, 35 yards, 0 TD

Defenders
 Tom Durn: 8 total tackles, 7 solo, 1 FF
 Domeni White: 5 total tackles, 3 solo, 1 FF, 1 break up
 Stephen Stoakes: 5 total tackles, 1 solo, 1 FR
 Dotun Ademiju: 6 total tackles, 3 solo, 2 break ups

Week 6: vs Solent Thrashers
The Bulls defence remained stout holding the visiting Thrashers to well below their season average, but a struggling offence meant back-to-back losses for the first time in 2015.

Passers
 Dan Wilkes: 4/9, 23 yards, 0 TD, 1 INT

Rushers
 Marc Bonazebi: 21 carries, 74 yards, 1 TD

Receivers
 Michael Beaty: 4 rec, 23 yards, 0 TD

Defenders
 Jack Pemberton: 3 total tackles, 2 solo, 1 INT, 2 break ups
 Dotun Ademiju: 5 total tackles, 3 solo, 1 FR, 1 break up
 Olu Amudipe: 5 total tackles, 3 solo, 1 sack, 1 FF, 1 break up
 Gareth Thomas: 5 total tackles, 1 solo, 1 INT

Week 7: at East Kent Mavericks
The Bulls made the long trip as heavy favourites but were shut out on offence for the first time since July 2014 in a hard-fought defensive battle.

Passers
 Richard Penwright: 6/15, 63 yards, 0 TD, 1 INT

Rushers
 Marcus Rey: 12 carries, 44 yards, 0 TD

Receivers
 Michael Beaty: 2 rec, 46 yards, 0 TD

Defenders
 Jake Harbon: 10 total tackles, 7 solo, 1 INT, 1 FF
 Olu Amudipe: 7 total tackles, 4 solo, 1 sack, 1 breakup 
 Gareth Thomas: 3 total tackles, 1 solo, 1 INT, 2 breakups
 Adam Fleet: 8 total tackles, 5 solo, 0.5 sacks

Week 8: at Hertfordshire Cheetahs
The Bulls struggled on a hot day in St. Albans and fell to their third straight defeat putting their play-off chances in jeopardy.

Passers
 Richard Penwright: 1/3, 5 yards, 0 TD, 1 INT
 Daniel Maher: 2/16, 12 yards, 0 TD, 2 INTs

Rushers
 Marcus Rey: 3 carries, 71 yards, 1 TD
 Mark Bonazebi: 11 carries, 108 yards, 0 TD

Receivers
 Marcus Rey: 1 rec, 11 yards, 0 TD

Defenders
 Dotun Ademiju: 6 total tackles, 3 solo, 1 sack, 3 break ups
 Jack Pemberton: 5 total tackles, 4 solo, 1 INT
 Adam Fleet: 7 total tackles, 3 solo, 1 FF
 Ilya Kaznachyeev: 10 total tackles, 9 solo

Week 9: at Ouse Valley Eagles
A Bulls squad decimated by injury travelled to Bedford and kept it close in a rain-soaked return fixture against their divisional rivals, but ended their hopes of play off football with another defeat.

Passers
 Richard Penwright: 8/15, 67 yards, 1 TD, 2 INTs

Rushers
 Mark Bonazebi: 38 carries, 166 yards, 2 TDs

Receivers
 Michael Doyle: 1 rec, 47 yards, 1 TD

Defenders
 Olu Amudipe: 5 total tackles, 4 solo, 2 sacks, 2 FR
 Gareth Thomas: 4 total tackles, 3 solo, 1 INT, 1 FF, 3 break ups
 Simon Taylor: 5 total tackles, 4 solo, 1 FF
 Dotun Ademiju: 3 total tackles, 3 solo, 1 FF, 1 break up

Week 10: vs Cambridgeshire Cats
The Bulls stopped the rot on the final day of the season by shutting out the already-relegated Cambridgeshire Cats at home and putting up their highest score of the season.

Passers
 Richard Penwright: 1/5, 8 Yards, 0 TD, 1 INT

Rushers
 Mark Bonazebi: 14 carries, 146 yards, 3 TD
 Dean Thomas: 5 carries, 60 yards, 1 TD
 Michael Doyle: 3 carries, 22 yards, 1 TD

Receivers
 Michael Beaty: 1 rec, 8 yards, 0 TD

Defenders
 Marcus Rey: 4 total tackles, 2 solo, 2 INT, 1 TD, 1 break up
 Lee Macken: 4 total tackles, 3 solo, 1 FF
 Dan Williams: 5 total tackles, 4 solo, 1 FR
 Gareth Thomas: 2 total tackles, 1 solo, 1 FR, 2 break ups

Notes

External links
Official Site
Birmingham Bulls Facebook page
Birmingham Bulls Twitter account

Birmingham Bulls (American football)
Birmingham Bulls
Birmingham Bulls